Boulogne-Ville is one of the railway stations serving the town Boulogne-sur-Mer, Pas-de-Calais department, northern France. The other station is Boulogne-Tintelleries.

History
The railway reached Boulogne in 1848. Passengers had to use a goods terminal until Boulogne-Ville was built in the 1850s. The building was of red and yellow bricks on a stone base, with red, yellow and white mortar. On 12 May 1902, the Chemin de fer de Boulogne à Bonningues (CF de BB) extended its line from Saint-Martin-Boulogne to the Quai Chanzy, outside Boulogne-Ville station. The CF de BB closed on 31 December 1935, apart from a freight service at the Bonningues-lès-Ardres end of the line. The station was destroyed during World War II. Boulogne-Ville station was rebuilt in 1962–63 on a new site, on the opposite bank of the Liane.

Services

The station is situated on the Longueau-Boulogne railway, and is served by local TER Hauts-de-France services from Boulogne to Lille-Flandres, Calais to Amiens and between Boulogne and Dunkerque. There is also a TGV service to Lille-Europe via Calais-Fréthun which takes 55 minutes.

References

Sources

Railway stations in Pas-de-Calais
Railway stations in France opened in 1962
Boulogne-sur-Mer